Direction of the Heart (stylized as "DIRECTION > of > the > HEART") is the nineteenth studio album by Scottish rock band Simple Minds, released on 21 October 2022 by BMG.

Background
On 24 October 2020, Simple Minds finished the recording of a new studio album in Germany.

On 14 June 2022, Simple Minds announced the forthcoming release on 21 October 2022 of their new studio album entitled Direction of the Heart via BMG. Most of the new album's tracks were written, created and demoed in Sicily (where both Jim Kerr and guitarist Charlie Burchill live). Unable to come to the UK because of COVID-19 quarantine rules, Simple Minds recorded the album at Hamburg's Chameleon Studios. According to the album liner notes, Direction of the Heart features fewer musicians than any previous Simple Minds album, with Burchill performing guitars, most keyboards, and most bass guitars, as well as programming much of the drumming.

Speaking of the new album, Kerr stated:

Album's name

The album takes its name not from a track from its standard edition (as it is often the case) but from "Direction of the Heart (Taormina 2022)", the first bonus track from its digital and deluxe editions, which is the new re-recorded 2022 version of the original track which had already been released on 4 January 2018 (and physically on 2 February 2018) as the B-side of the "Magic" 7" vinyl single, the lead single from Walk Between Worlds, the band's previous studio album.

Songs
Sources 

 The album's opening track "Vision Thing" was released for free on 14 June 2022 on YouTube as the album's lead single
 "First You Jump" was co-written by bassist Ged Grimes 
 "Human Traffic" features a guest appearance from Sparks' frontman Russell Mael (this might be a reworking of the song "Human Trafficking" written in Hamburg during Summer 2009, first mentioned by Jim Kerr in February 2010, "not to be finished quite yet" as Jim Kerr stated on 25 November 2010) 
 "Solstice Kiss" is a song first written (by Grimes) during the Big Music sessions and mentioned several times during the recordings; re-recorded at the Sphere Recording Studio during the Walk Between Worlds sessions, it was (then) announced as a future contender for the next Simple Minds album
 "Act of Love" is a reimagining of one of the earliest songs written in 1978 by Kerr and Burchill, coinciding with the group's first performance at Glasgow's Satellite City in January 1978. Simple Minds had already shared this track for free in January 2022.
 "Planet Zero" (lyrics by Kerr, music by Burchill) was described by Kerr as "an insanely catchy and thundering 'space-rock' track with music written by Burchill and featuring arguably one of his best ever guitar melodies", a song "that conjures up Prince set to the background of Hawkwind" and "sounds like pure Simple Minds, albeit remade and remodelled"; original recording started in late August 2011 during the Greatest Hits + Europe Tour and completed in London at the start of September 2011 with Steve Hillage producing 
 "The Walls Came Down" is a cover of the Call's 1983 single 
 A previous version of "Direction of the Heart" had already been released on 4 January 2018 (and physically on 2 February 2018) as the B-side of the "Magic" 7" vinyl single

Singles
On 14 June 2022, Simple Minds released for free on YouTube the lead single "Vision Thing". On 9 July 2022, Simple Minds released on YouTube a lyric video for "Vision Thing".

On 2 September 2022, it was announced that the world premiere of the new Simple Minds single "First You Jump" would occur on 5 September 2022.

On 7 December 2022, Simple Minds announced the forthcoming release on 9 December 2022 of "Traffic", the JG Ballard-inspired new single featuring Russell Mael of Sparks. This is a new edit of the track "Human Traffic" accompanied by a brand new acoustic version.

Jim Kerr stated about the song:

Reception

Direction of the Heart received generally positive reviews from critics. On the review aggregation website Metacritic, the album has a weighted average score of 75 out of 100 based on 6 reviews, indicating "generally favourable reviews".

On 28 October 2022, one week after its release, Direction of the Heart reached #4 in the UK Albums charts, #3 in the Scottish Albums charts and #2 (its highest peak so far) in the UK Independent Albums charts.

Track listing

Personnel

Simple Minds
 Jim Kerr – vocals, backing vocals
 Charlie Burchill – guitars, keyboards (all tracks); programming (1–4, 6–11), bass guitar (1, 4, 7–10)
 Ged Grimes – bass guitar (2, 5, 11); keyboards, programming (2); drum programming, gong, synthesizer (5)
 Cherisse Osei – drums (1, 7, 9)
 Sarah Brown – backing vocals (4, 5, 7, 8, 10)

Additional musicians
 Andy Wright – programming (all tracks), backing vocals (1–10)
 Gavin Goldberg – programming (all tracks), backing vocals (2)
 Gary Clark – backing vocals (1, 2, 7)
 Kathleen MacInnes – backing vocals (2)
 Russell Mael – vocals (3)
 Andrew Gillespie – synthesizer (5)

Technical
 Simple Minds – production (all tracks), engineering (1–5, 7–11)
 Andy Wright – additional production
 Gavin Goldberg – additional production (all tracks), engineering (1–5, 7–11)
 Jean-Pierre Chalbos – mastering
 Alan Moulder – mixing
 Caesar Edmunds – mix engineering (1–5, 7–11)
 Tom Herbert – mix engineering (1–9)
 Eike Freese – engineering
 Kevin Burleigh – engineering (2)

Artwork
 Anthony Lamb – cover illustration
 Christie Goodwin – photography
 Thorsten Samesch – photography

Charts

References

2022 albums
Simple Minds albums